Lawrence McCully (May 28, 1831- April 10, 1892) was a justice of the Hawaii Supreme Court and Speaker of the Hawaii House of Representatives.

McCully, son of Charles McCully, was born in New York City on May 28, 1831. About two years later his father moved to Oswego, New York, from which place the son entered Yale College at the beginning of Sophomore year.  He graduated Yale in 1852.  Having taught for several months in a family in New Orleans, and for a year in Kentucky, he then formed a plan of settling in the Hawaiian Islands, where he arrived in December, 1854. The introductions which he brought secured him an appointment as Police Justice of the Hilo district, which he held from Sept. 1, 1855, until his resignation on April 1, 1857. He then bought land and set out an orange orchard at Kona, Hawaii, but in 1858 removed to Honolulu, where he began the study of law in the office of Chief Justice Charles Harris.  He was admitted to the bar in March, 1859. In 1860 he was elected to the Hawaii House of Representatives, of which he was chosen Speaker. From April, 1862, he served as Interpreter to the Supreme Court, resigning his office in January, 1865, to become the clerk of the same Court. Six years later he resigned this office also, in order to accept the position of Deputy Attorney-General. On February 1, 1877, he was commissioned as Associate Justice of the Supreme Court of the Kingdom, and this position he held until his death.

In 1891 he visited Europe, and was prostrated by an attack of the grip in California on his return. His health, which had previously been somewhat delicate, was thus undermined, and he failed gradually until his death, at his home in Honolulu, on April 10, 1892, in his 61st year.

Judge McCully was married on May 26, 1866, to Ellen Harvey, of Kenduskeag, Maine, who survived him, with an adopted child.

References

Attribution

External links
 

1831 births
1892 deaths
Lawyers from New York City
Politicians from Oswego, New York
Yale College alumni
Hawaii lawyers
Members of the Hawaiian Kingdom House of Representatives
Speakers of the Hawaii House of Representatives
Justices of the Hawaii Supreme Court
Members of the Hawaiian Kingdom Privy Council
19th-century American politicians
19th-century American judges
19th-century American lawyers